Ragnhild Bratberg (born 9 June 1961) is a Norwegian orienteering competitor and a cross-country skier. In orienteering, she won the overall Orienteering World Cup in 1988, and represented Norway several times in the World Orienteering Championships relays, winning medals in 1985, 1987 and 1991. In ski orienteering she won four individual gold medals at the World Ski Orienteering Championships, and once in the relay. She was awarded Egebergs Ærespris in 1988.

Personal life
Bratberg was born in Ringsaker on 9 June 1961.

Orienteering career
Bratberg is Relay World Champion in Orienteering from 1987 as a member of the Norwegian winning team, and also having silver medals from 1985 and 1991. At the 1981 World Orienteering Championships she was part of the Norwegian team that placed fourth, and placed 10th in the individual contest.

She won the Overall Orienteering World Cup in 1984 (unofficial cup) and in 1988, and finished second in 1990.

Ski orienteering career
Bratberg has won four individual World Championships in Ski Orienteering. She won gold medal in the individual competition in 1986. In 1988 she placed first in the short course and second in the long course. In 1990 she won both the long and short courses.

She became Relay World Champion in  1986, along with Toril Hallan and Ellen Sofie Olsvik. In 1988 the Norwegian team won silver medals, and in 1990 her team won bronze medals. She finished second in the World Cup 1989.

Awards
Bratberg was awarded Egebergs Ærespris in 1988.

References

1961 births
Living people
People from Ringsaker
Norwegian orienteers
Female orienteers
Foot orienteers
Ski-orienteers
World Orienteering Championships medalists
Sportspeople from Innlandet